Louis P. Fuhrmann (1868–1931) was Mayor of the City of Buffalo, New York, serving 1910–1917.  He was born in Buffalo, New York on November 7, 1868. He grew up on the city's east side, graduated from Central High School, and began working in the meat packing industry.  In 1892, he started his own meat packing business at 1010 Clinton Street.  He married Alice S. Meald on July 13, 1900.

In 1905, Fuhrmann was first elected a member of the Board of Aldermen from the Fifth Ward.  He was elected November 2, 1909, as the Democratic candidate.   He was elected to a second term on November 4, 1913.   During this term, America entered World War I and the Mayor was integral in assisting the Federal Government in coordination of the American forces.  He was defeated in his quest for a third term on November 6, 1917, and returned to his meat packing business.

In 1917, he was elected president of the Buffalo Baseball and Amusement Company and, in 1922, appointed a member of the Buffalo Board of Education.  He died on February 23, 1931, and was buried in Forest Lawn Cemetery.

References

1868 births
1931 deaths
Mayors of Buffalo, New York
Burials at Forest Lawn Cemetery (Buffalo)
School board members in New York (state)